The NAIA Softball Championship is the annual tournament to determine the national champions of NAIA collegiate softball in the United States and formerly in Canada. It has been held annually since 1981. The South Commons Complex Sports Complex in Columbus, Georgia previously hosted the 2021 and 2022 NAIA Softball Championships and will host again for the upcoming 2023 Championship tournament. 

The reigning national champions are Oklahoma City, who won their eleventh national title in 2022.

Oklahoma City are also the most titled program, with eleven NAIA championship titles.

Results

 * = 1st ever "if necessary" game after William Carey came out of losers' bracket to defeat Auburn Montgomery in first championship game of the double-elimination tournament.

Championships

 Schools highlighted in pink are closed or no longer sponsor athletics.
 Schools highlight in yellow have reclassified athletics from the NAIA.

See also
NCAA Softball Championships (Division I, Division II, Division III)
Women's College World Series

References

External links 
NAIA Softball

Softball
NAIA softball
NAIA national women's soft
College softball championships